Dyllan Lanser (born 2 March 1995) is a Dutch football player who plays as a left-back for Tweede Klasse club Unicum.

Club career
He made his professional debut in the Eerste Divisie for Almere City FC on 14 September 2012 in a game against SC Cambuur.

Lanser signed with ASV De Dijk as a free agent in 2017. A year later Lanser returned to his hometown Lelystad, where he began playing for Lelystad '67. He left this club in 2019 for fellow Lelystad-club VV Unicum.

References

External links
 
 

1995 births
Footballers from Lelystad
Living people
Dutch footballers
Almere City FC players
Eerste Divisie players
ASV De Dijk players
Association football defenders
Derde Divisie players